The 1994 Milwaukee Mustangs season was the first season for the Milwaukee Mustangs. They finished the 1994 season 0–12, and were one of two teams in the American Conference to miss the playoffs.

Regular season

Schedule

Standings

Awards
No Milwaukee players made the All–Arena teams.

References

Milwaukee Mustangs (1994–2001) seasons
1994 Arena Football League season
Milwaukee Mustangs Season, 1994
1990s in Milwaukee